Steven B. Grant (born March 7, 1983) is an attorney and an American politician who served as the Mayor of Boynton Beach, Florida from 2016 to 2022. He graduated in 2005 from the University of Maryland Robert H. Smith School of Business with a bachelor of science degree in Finance. He then earned a J.D. from the Florida Coastal School of Law in 2010, and has studied abroad at the Royal Melbourne Institute of Technology, China University of Political Science and Law in Beijing, and the University of the Netherlands Antilles. In 2021, Grant announced he was running in the 2022 United States Senate election in Florida against incumbent Republican Marco Rubio, as an Independent.

References

External links
http://www.stevenbgrant.com/
https://grantlegal.com/

Living people
1983 births
21st-century American lawyers
21st-century American politicians
People from Boynton Beach, Florida
University of Maryland, College Park alumni
Florida lawyers
Mayors of places in Florida
Florida Independents
Florida Republicans
Florida Democrats
Candidates in the 2022 United States Senate elections